Christopher Donald Sogge  (born July 14, 1960) is an American mathematician. He is the J. J. Sylvester Professor of Mathematics at Johns Hopkins University and the editor-in-chief of the American Journal of Mathematics. His research concerns Fourier analysis and partial differential equations.

Education and career
Sogge graduated from the University of Chicago in 1982, and earned a doctorate in mathematics from Princeton University in 1985 under the supervision of Elias M. Stein. He taught at the University of Chicago from 1985 to 1989 and the University of California, Los Angeles from 1989 to 1996 before moving to Johns Hopkins.

Personal life
In 1987, he married Elizabeth Lombardi. They had three children, Lewis, Susanna and William Sogge.

Awards and honors
In 2012, he became one of the inaugural fellows of the American Mathematical Society.   He has fellowships from the National Science Foundation, Alfred P. Sloan Foundation, Guggenheim Foundation, and he received the Presidential Young Investigator Award.  In 2007 he received the Diversity Recognition Award from Johns Hopkins University.

Books
Fourier integrals in classical analysis (Cambridge Tracts in Mathematics 105, Cambridge University Press, 1993)
Lectures on non-linear wave equations (International Press, 1995; 2nd ed., 2008)
Hangzhou lectures on eigenfunctions of the Laplacian, (Annals of Mathematical Studies 188, Princeton University Press, 2014)

References

External links
Home page
Google scholar profile

Living people
20th-century American mathematicians
21st-century American mathematicians
University of Chicago alumni
Princeton University alumni
University of Chicago faculty
University of California, Los Angeles faculty
Johns Hopkins University faculty
Fellows of the American Mathematical Society
1960 births